St Vincent's Private Hospital Melbourne (formerly known as St Vincent's & Mercy Private Hospital) is a private hospital group in Victoria of Australia that is located across four campuses in the Melbourne suburbs of Fitzroy, East Melbourne , Kew and Werribee, Victoria. Each campus is denominated St Vincent's Private Hospital, with the associated suburb included as an addendum to the designation.

The (Catholic) Sisters of Charity and Sisters of Mercy had run the St Vincent's Private and Mercy Private hospitals independently for more than 70 years before their merger, the first of its kind. T

St Vincent's Private Hospital purchased Vimy House Private Hospital in 2008, creating the third campus. Werribee was purpose built and opened in January 2018 with 112 beds and 4 operating theatres. Currently across the four sites, St Vincent's Private Melbourne has a capacity of over 600 beds.

Major specialities include interventional cardiology and cardiothoracic surgery, obstetrics, neurosurgery and orthopaedics, paediatrics, ENT, hand surgery, oncology and general surgery.

See also
 Teaching staff of University of Melbourne, Department of Surgery
 List of hospitals in Australia
 Healthcare in Australia

References

External links

Hospital buildings completed in 1998
Hospitals in Melbourne
Hospitals established in 1998
1998 establishments in Australia
Fitzroy, Victoria